The 2022–23 Michigan Tech Huskies men's ice hockey season is the 102nd season of play for the program. They represent Michigan Technological University in the 2022–23 NCAA Division I men's ice hockey season and for the 5th season in the Central Collegiate Hockey Association (CCHA). They are coached by Joe Shawhan, in his sixth season, and play their home games at MacInnes Student Ice Arena.

Season

Departures

Recruiting

Roster
As of August 26, 2022.

Standings

Schedule and results

|-
!colspan=12 style=";" | Exhibition

|-
!colspan=12 style=";" | Regular Season

|-
!colspan=12 style=";" | 

|-
!colspan=12 style=";" | 

|-
!colspan=12 style=";" | Regular Season

|-
!colspan=12 style=";" | 

|-
!colspan=12 style=";" |

Scoring statistics

Goaltending statistics

Rankings

References

2022-23
Michigan Tech Huskies
Michigan Tech Huskies
Michigan Tech Huskies
Michigan Tech Huskies